= Carsenty =

Carsenty may refer to:

- 13333 Carsenty, main-belt asteroid
- Uri Carsenty (born 1949), Israeli planetary scientist
